Patricia Elorza Eguiara (born 8 April 1984) is a Spanish former handball player for the Spanish national team.

She participated at the 2011 World Women's Handball Championship in Brazil, where Spain won a bronze medal, the first world championship medal for the Spanish women's team. She was also part of the national team at the 2012 Summer Olympics, where they also won a bronze medal.

References

1984 births
Living people
Spanish female handball players
Olympic medalists in handball
Olympic handball players of Spain
Handball players at the 2012 Summer Olympics
Handball players at the 2016 Summer Olympics
Olympic bronze medalists for Spain
Medalists at the 2012 Summer Olympics
Sportspeople from Vitoria-Gasteiz
Spanish expatriate sportspeople in France
Expatriate handball players
Competitors at the 2013 Mediterranean Games
Mediterranean Games competitors for Spain
Handball players from the Basque Country (autonomous community)
21st-century Spanish women